Fanghua Lin (born March 11, 1959), also written as Fang-Hua Lin, is a Chinese-born American mathematician. He is currently the Silver Professor at the Courant Institute of Mathematical Sciences at New York University. He applies rigorous analysis to nonlinear systems and is a leader in this field.

Biography
Lin was born in 1959 in Ningbo, Zhejiang, China, and graduated from the Department of Mathematics of Zhejiang University in 1981. He went to the United States to obtain his PhD from the Department of Mathematics at the University of Minnesota in 1985. From 1985 to 1988, he was an instructor at the Courant Institute of Mathematical Sciences at New York University. Then he went to the University of Chicago, becoming a full professor there from 1988 until 1989. In 1989, he started his professorship at New York University. He was then awarded the Silver Professorship at the Courant Institute.

Lin made substantial contributions in Ginzburg–Landau theory.

Awards and honors
 1989–1991, Alfred P. Sloan Research Fellowship
 1989–1994, Presidential Young Investigator Award
 1990, Invited Speaker, International Congress of Mathematicians, Kyoto
 1999, Ordway Chair Visiting Professor, University of Minnesota
 2002, Bôcher Memorial Prize, by American Mathematical Society
 2004, Shiing-shen Chern Prize
 2004, Fellow, American Academy of Arts and Sciences
 2014, Fellow of the American Mathematical Society
 2022, SIAM Fellow, "for significant contributions to our understanding of the properties of solutions throughout nonlinear partial differential equations"

References

External links
 The Mathematics Genealogy Project - Fang-Hua Lin

1959 births
Living people
20th-century Chinese  mathematicians
Mathematicians from Zhejiang
21st-century American mathematicians
Chinese emigrants to the United States
Fellows of the American Academy of Arts and Sciences
Fellows of the American Mathematical Society
Fellows of the Society for Industrial and Applied Mathematics
University of Minnesota alumni
Zhejiang University alumni
Academic staff of Zhejiang University
Scientists from Ningbo
Courant Institute of Mathematical Sciences faculty
University of Chicago faculty
Educators from Ningbo